Kleszczówek  is a village in the administrative district of Gmina Rutka-Tartak, within Suwałki County, Podlaskie Voivodeship, in north-eastern Poland, close to the border with Lithuania.

Until 31 December 2009 it was a part of gmina Wiżajny.

References

Villages in Suwałki County